Mertel is a German surname. Notable people with the surname include:

Elias Mertel (ca. 1561–1626), German lutenist and composer
Teodolfo Mertel (1806–1899), lawyer and cardinal of the Roman Catholic Church
Heinz Mertel (born 1936), German sport shooter

See also
 Mertl

German-language surnames
Surnames from given names